The St. Regis Chicago, formerly Wanda Vista Tower, is a 101-story,  supertall skyscraper in Chicago, Illinois. Construction started in August 2016, and was completed in 2020. It is the tallest structure in the world designed by a woman. It forms a part of the Lakeshore East development and overlooks the Chicago River near Lake Michigan.

Designed by architect Jeanne Gang and her architectural firm, Studio Gang Architects, the St. Regis complements the design of the nearby Aqua skyscraper, also designed by Gang, as the two tallest structures in the world designed by a woman. Initially a joint project between Magellan Development Group and Chinese based Wanda Group, the skyscraper cost nearly $1 billion to construct.  Magellan bought the project entirely in 2020, and then partnered with St. Regis Hotels & Resorts, which will open the hotel portion in 2022.

The structure consists of three interconnected towers, called "stems" with differing heights in a step-like arrangement.  The stems are formed from alternating truncated pyramidal shapes called "frustums", giving each tower an undulating appearance, further accentuated by differing shades of glass in alternating pattern. The composition has been likened to sculptor Constantin Brâncuși's Endless Column. According to Studio Gang Architects, the tower "presents itself as three interconnected volumes of differing heights, moving rhythmically in and out of plane" as a result of the curvilinear design. The tower topped out in April 2019.

Usage
The project was initially planned to house Wanda's Vista luxury hotel brand, its first in North America, and include condominium residences. In keeping with the general plan, The St. Regis contains 393 condominium residences, and 191 hotel rooms, including 33 suites.

Design

The building's chief architect is Jeanne Gang, head of Studio Gang Architects. Chicago based bKL Architecture is the project's architect of record. The design has three interconnected volumes with differing heights. Totalling a height of 101 stories, the east, middle, and west towers are 47, 71, and 93 stories tall, respectively. Mechanical space occupies the remaining floors. Upon completion, Vista Tower designers are targeting a Silver Leadership in Energy and Environmental Design (LEED) certification.

The three towers feature a curvilinear design, and are made up of alternating frustums. The towers are clad in 6 different shades of glass. The uppermost segment of the tallest tower contains an unoccupied "blow through" floor to prevent excess swaying in the wind. The design was described as "stacks of tapering, truncated pyramids that alternate between right-side-up and upside-down" by the Chicago Tribune. The tower has a notably smaller footprint than other supertalls in Chicago; it has a building height-to-core aspect ratio of 40-to-1.

Condominium interiors will be designed by hospitality design firm Hirsch Bedner Associates, while the hotel interior will be designed by San Francisco firm Gensler. Philadelphia-based OLIN will design the project's green spaces, including the rooftop gardens. The structural engineering of the tower was managed by Magnusson Klemencic Associates.

Columns 
Unlike most buildings, the building's perimeter columns step inward and outward instead of going directly upwards. Each column projects about 5 inches outward or inward from the one below it. This was chosen over using columns set on a diagonal, which would have sacrificed interior space.

Wind resistance 
The tower uses coupled dual-core shear-wall assembly that connects the three buildings for wind resistance. The two outer cores are tied together via a 508-ft-tall reinforced concrete spine, from floors 15 to 51 above the upper street grade. For gravity loads, columns that continue to foundations support a 123-ft-long spine wall. This 2-ft-thick spine transfers wind loads from the middle tower to the cores of the 51-story tower to the east and the 101-story tower to the west.

The building contains uninhabited "blow-through floors" to reduce wind-induced sway. A "spine wall" in the tower’s midsection links two outer cores, helping the two towers act as one unit. The wall is perforated so doors and hallways go through. A "buttressed core" in the two outer stalks are built out to the outer edge of the building. The outer walls are also perforated, leaving openings for windows.

Reception 
Edward Keegan of Crain's Chicago Business praised the design of the building, calling it "second only to Hancock in the gracefulness in its silhouette" and a "proud and soaring thing". However, he also criticised several engineering choices, notably the execution of the tower's blow-through floors.

See also

List of tallest buildings in the United States
List of tallest buildings in Chicago
Architecture of Chicago

References

External links
 Vista Tower - Official Website

St. Regis hotels
Residential skyscrapers in Chicago
Skyscraper hotels in Chicago
Condo hotels in the United States
Residential condominiums in Chicago
Studio Gang Architects buildings
Lakeshore East
Buildings and structures completed in 2020